Tan Zuoren (born 15 May 1954), from Chengdu, Sichuan province, People's Republic of China, is an environmentalist, writer and former editor of Literati magazine (文化人).

On February 9, 2010, Zuoren was sentenced to 5 years in prison for "inciting subversion of state power." Amnesty International Asia-Pacific Deputy Director said: “His arrest, unfair trial and now the guilty verdict are further disturbing examples of how the Chinese authorities use vague and over broad laws to silence and punish dissenting voices.” Due to the nature of the charges and circumstances of the trial, he has been described as a political prisoner.

2009 court case

After the 2008 Sichuan earthquake Tan came up with a proposal called the "5.12 Student Archive" (5·12学生档案) asking people who lost their children in the quake to set up a victim database.  But for his trouble, Chengdu police searched his home and confiscated his DVDs, manuscripts and documents. Tan coined the expression「豆腐渣」(tofu dreg project) to describe the shoddy construction quality of Sichuan schools.  On March 28, 2009, he was detained on allegations for subversion of state power.  Tan Zuoren was formally accused of defaming the Communist Party of China in email comments about the Tiananmen Square protests of 1989.

According to the indictment, 

On August 12, 2009, his trial in Chengdu, Sichuan province was held.  Tan's lawyer Pu Zhiqiang said that "The authorities getting their hands on your witness list and then harassing the witnesses and locking them away, that’s a disgrace for the courts in China. But it is the status quo of our judicial system, I think they are doing that because they are afraid.”

Tan Zuoren's defense lawyers Xia Lin and Pu Zhiqiang in their defense summation told the court that:

Contemporary artist Ai Weiwei, who travelled to Chengdu to testify, said he and 10 other volunteers were woken up by police entering their hotel rooms at 3 am dawn on August 12.  He was beaten up and prevented from leaving until after the trial adjourned.  Tan's supporters and Amnesty International said he was detained because he planned to issue an independent report on the collapse of school buildings during the Sichuan earthquake.  Ai said "they were like gangs in a movie, they could do whatever they wanted. It was very scary."

Tan's trial began a week after another earthquake activist, Huang Qi, was tried on state secrets charges in Chengdu; he was convicted and sentenced to three years' imprisonment on November 23, 2009.  Tan's lawyer, Pu Zhiqiang said the report on the earthquake all show his investigation is objective and scientific.

Hong Kong's now TV aired footage of Chengdu police searching the luggage and hotel rooms of two of its journalists, who were prevented from leaving the hotel for seven hours, while police said they looked for drugs. Footage of security forces manhandling reporters was also shown widely on television news.

2010 appeal
On June 9, 2010, the Chengdu Intermediate People's Court rejected his appeal. The sentence of 5 years in jail and 3 years deprived of political rights was upheld.

2014 release
Zuoren was released on March 27, 2014 "under a kind of probation - he doesn't have the right to speak up", according to Ai.

See also

 Hu Jia
 Weiquan movement
 Corruption in China

References

External links
 Tan's blog
 川震公民調查拒絕遺忘，張潔平，亚洲周刊二十三卷十五期，2009年4月
 彭州石化危害成都城市安全，譚作人，2008年11月30日，亚洲周刊
譚作人被禁制的最後陳述 亞洲週刊二十三卷四十七期 (2009-11-29)
社民連到中聯辦示威要求釋放譚作人劉 曉 波2010-02-10
 豆腐渣工程罪魁逍遙法外  譚作人追查反被以言入罪 2010-02-10 
四川維權人士譚作人被判刑五年  國際特赦組織:...中國當局運用「模糊和過於廣義的法律壓制和懲罰不同意見的手法」

Chinese activists
Chinese dissidents
Chinese environmentalists
Living people
1954 births
Writers from Chengdu
Weiquan movement
Prisoners and detainees of China
People's Republic of China journalists